Olha Semenova (born October 6, 1964) is a Ukrainian former handball player who competed for the Soviet Union in the 1988 Summer Olympics.

In 1988 she won the bronze medal with the Soviet team. She played three matches and scored six goals.

References

1964 births
Living people
Soviet female handball players
Ukrainian female handball players
Olympic handball players of the Soviet Union
Handball players at the 1988 Summer Olympics
Olympic bronze medalists for the Soviet Union
Olympic medalists in handball
Medalists at the 1988 Summer Olympics